The Timrå Ladies Open was a women's professional golf tournament on the Swedish Golf Tour, played between 1997 and 1999. It was always held in Timrå near Sundsvall, Sweden.

The event was introduced in 1997 as the season's only new tournament, in addition to the launch of the Telia Ladies Finale and the one-off Volvo Anläggningsmaskiner Open. 

All three editions were designated as Swedish International tournaments.

Winners

See also
Norrporten Ladies Open

References

Swedish Golf Tour (women) events